Maroantsetra , formerly Louisbourg, is a market town and domestic seaport in Analanjirofo Region, Madagascar, at the northern end of the Bay of Antongil. In 2005 it had a population of 42,529 people.

History
Maurice Benyovszky arrived in Maroantsetra in February 1774. He established a colony here, which was named Louisbourg. A hospital was built as well as a quarantine on Nosy Mangabe island just off the coast.

Geography and climate
The Antainambalana River flows into the bay after meandering around the town. It is one of the wettest places in Madagascar due to the trade winds, and receives an average of 138 inches (350 cm) of rain annually.

Landmarks and economy
Maroantsetra is the main point of access to Masoala National Park and the Nosy Mangabe special reserve.

Transport
The town is served by Maroantsetra Airport. The National road 5 links the town to Toamasina though its largely unpaved .

The Melissa Express passenger boat operates between the town and Mananara, and further on to Soanierana and Ivongo. The trip to Mananara typically takes about three hours and runs twice a week between September and February, though the service is not always reliable due to adverse weather conditions.
Cargo boats permit passengers and travel to Mananara, Île Sainte Marie, Tamatave and Antalaha.

Notable people
 Jacques Rabemananjara (1913–2005), politician and writer

References

Cities in Madagascar
Populated places in Analanjirofo